WSCQ-LP (96.3 FM) is a radio station licensed to serve the community of Sun City Center, Florida. The station is owned by Sun City Center Radio, Inc. It airs a community radio format.

The station was assigned the call sign WYYE-LP by the Federal Communications Commission on April 8, 2014. A week later, on April 15, the station changed its call sign to WSCQ-LP

References

External links
 Official Website
 

SCQ-LP
SCQ-LP
Radio stations established in 2014
2014 establishments in Florida
Community radio stations in the United States
Hillsborough County, Florida